Tony Mendoza may refer to:
Tony Mendoza (politician),  California state legislator
Tony Mendoza (photographer), Cuban-American photographer
Tony Mendoza (artist), Miami-based, Cuban-American artist